407 Long Range Patrol Squadron (abbreviated 407 LRP Sqn, formerly 407 Maritime Patrol Squadron) is a long range and maritime patrol squadron of the Royal Canadian Air Force. It is located at 19 Wing Comox, on Vancouver Island, British Columbia, and operates the CP-140 Aurora.

History
No. 407 Coastal Strike Squadron was formed at RAF Thorney Island, England on 8 May 1941, first training on the Bristol Blenheim. It was one of seven Article XV RCAF units to serve with RAF Coastal Command.

The squadron's wartime history can be divided into two periods. From September 1941 to January 1943, the squadron operated as a "strike" squadron attacking enemy shipping with the Lockheed Hudson. It was as a strike squadron that it won its reputation and its nickname "The Demon Squadron". On 29 January 1943 it was re-designated as 407 General Reconnaissance Squadron, and for the remainder of the war it protected friendly shipping from the U-boat threat operating the Vickers Wellington.

The squadron was disbanded on 4 June 1945 following the end of the Second World War. On 1 July 1952 the squadron was reactivated at RCAF Station Comox as 407 Maritime Reconnaissance Squadron flying the Avro Lancaster. On 17 July 1956 it was redesignated as a Maritime Patrol Squadron.

The squadron has served continuously in Comox since 1952 flying the Lancaster, Lockheed Neptune, and Canadair CP-107 Argus. On 28 June 1975, the squadron was presented its standard by Walter Stewart Owen, Lieutenant Governor of British Columbia.

Currently, 407 Squadron flies the Lockheed CP-140 Aurora on coastal patrol, anti-submarine and long range patrol duties. It used these aircraft to conduct operations in the Arabian Sea after the 11 September 2001 terrorist attacks.

Squadron commanding officers
Lieutenant-Colonel Garry Rheaume: 1997-1999
Lieutenant-Colonel Gary Szczerbaniwicz: 1999-2002
Lieutenant-Colonel Fred Bigelow: 2002 – 2004
Lieutenant-Colonel Paul Ormsby: 2004 – 2006
Lieutenant-Colonel Mike Hogan: 2006 – 2008
Lieutenant-Colonel Mario Leblanc: 2008 – 2010
Lieutenant-Colonel Dave Robinson: 2010 – 2012
Lieutenant-Colonel Jason Kenny: 2012 – 2014
Lieutenant-Colonel Andrew McCorquodale: 2014 - 2016
Major Kreager Graham: May 2016 - August 2016
Lieutenant-Colonel Jean-Philippe Gagnon: August 2016 - August 2018
Lieutenant-Colonel Patrick Castonguay: August 2018 – August 2020
Lieutenant-Colonel Fil Bohac: August 2020 – August 2022
Lieutenant-Colonel Don Jamont: August 2022 – Present

References

Citations

Bibliography

  

 Canadian Department of National Defence - Honours & Recognition for the Men and Women of the Canadian Armed Forces 10th Edition - 2016. Accessed 14 March 2019

External links
 407 Long Range Patrol Squadron website
 CAF – History of 407 Squadron
 CAF – World War II Coastal Command

Royal Canadian Air Force squadrons
Canadian Forces aircraft squadrons